The 1969 Paris–Roubaix was the 67th edition of the Paris–Roubaix cycle race and was held on 13 April 1969. The race started in Compiègne and finished in Roubaix. The race was won by Walter Godefroot of the Flandria team.

General classification

References

Paris–Roubaix
Paris-Roubaix
Paris-Roubaix
Paris-Roubaix
Paris-Roubaix